In Inuit mythology, Pana was the god who cared for souls in the underworld (Adlivun) before they were reincarnated.

References

Inuit gods
Underworld gods